The siege of Samarkand (1220) took place in 1220 A.D. after Genghis Khan, founder of the Mongol Empire, had launched a multi-pronged invasion of the Khwarazmian Empire, ruled by Shah Muhammad II. The Mongols had laid siege to the border town of Otrar, but finding its defences obdurate, a large force commanded by Genghis and his youngest son Tolui detached from the vanguard and set off southwards, towards Transoxiana.

Samarkand was the Shah's capital and the pivot of his defence — the city's garrison was large and its battlements were one of the strongest in the empire. Genghis, however, managed to isolate it by capturing and destroying Bukhara in a surprise manoeuvre, and then laying waste to the nearby Transoxianan towns. After repelling relief forces, the Mongol army, now reinforced after the capture of Otrar, ambushed and massacred a sortie by the town's defenders. The citizens of the city soon surrendered at the instigation of the Muslim clergy; most were however enslaved or conscripted in traditional Mongol fashion.

A small force held out in the citadel for around one month, after which around half managed to break through the Mongol lines and escape over the Amu Darya. Although the city was then comprehensively looted and pillaged, it revived slowly under the Pax Mongolica, and then, in the late 14th-century, returned to worldwide prominence as the capital of the Timurid Empire.

Background

Forces

While medieval chroniclers have attributed huge forces to both sides, modern historians are more conservative in their estimates, but precise numbers are still widely disputed; the only certainty is that the total Mongol force was larger than the Shah's army. The Shah, who distrusted his commanders and had not yet implemented his desired methods of administration, decided on a strategy of distributing troops inside his major cities, such as Samarkand, Balkh and Otrar. It is likely that he expected only a "normal-sized" Mongol raid, which would devastate the countryside but leave the cities unharmed. The Khwarazmids would only previously have fought nomads such as the Kangly, who had no knowledge of siege warfare; that these invaders were bringing a veritable army of engineers who were skilled in siege warfare came as a great shock. In any event, estimates for the city's garrison vary widely.

Prelude
The first attack on the Khwarazmian Empire made by the Mongols was at the town of Otrar, whose governor had made the grievous mistake of insulting the Khan. This border city, however, was able to hold out for a surprising length of time, and so Genghis made the decision to split his forces to try to outmanoeuvre the Shah. He had learnt of the strength of Samarkand's defences at Otrar, and thus made the decision to march through the Kizil Kum desert to Bukhara. The city was stunned by the Mongol approach, which had been through an area previously thought impassable, and, after a sortie was annihilated along the Amu Darya, the lower town surrendered and was promptly pillaged. The inner citadel held out for less than two weeks, but after the Mongols breached the walls, all inside were massacred. Unlike during later campaigns, the Mongols were comparatively lenient with the citizens of Bukhara; however, a large number were conscripted to be used in the following sieges.

Events
By capturing Bukhara, Genghis Khan had split the forces of the Shah, which were located at Samarkand, Balkh, and Urgench.

The Mongols, having encircled the city, were engaged by the Turko-Iranian defenders. The sortie, which consisted of twenty war-elephants and a large body of cavalry, was ambushed and driven back. A sizeable section of the Samarkand garrison surrendered shortly afterwards, and were promptly executed, but the citadel, as in Bukhara, had to be taken by force. It held out for one month, before a small force managed to cut their way through the Mongol lines and escape over the Amu Darya. The Mongols released the elephants, which had survived, into the surrounding countryside, where they quickly died due to lack of food.

Timur would restore the city after he made it his capital in 1370. He rebuilt the palaces and the city walls, which were still in ruins, and commissioned numerous mosques, gardens and pavilions to re-establish Samarkand's importance on an international level.

References

Samarkand
1220 in the Mongol Empire
Samarkand
Mongol invasion of the Khwarazmian Empire
Sieges involving the Mongol Empire